Marian Biskup (December 19, 1922 – April 16, 2012) was a Polish historian, author and academic, who specialized in the history of the Baltics, Pomerelia, Teutonic Order, Prussia, Toruń and Copernicus. He was a member of the International Commission for the study of the Teutonic Order.

Biography
Biskup was born in Inowroclaw. He wrote on a number of historical subjects and particularly Nicholas Copernicus. Biskup was known for his work on the history of Toruń.

References

1922 births
2012 deaths
People from Inowrocław
20th-century Polish historians
Polish male non-fiction writers